Léon Jongen (2 March 1884 – 18 November 1969) was a Belgian composer and organist.

Musical career
He was born in Liège, on March 2, 1884. His father Alphonse had an atelier there and worked as a woodcarver.  Jongen studied at the Royal Conservatory of Liège and was appointed as organist at the Saint-Jacques church of Liège after his graduation in 1898. He left his post at Saint-Jacques church in 1908 in order to tour Europe with a piano quartet. He eventually settled in Paris, becoming accompanist to the tenor Imbart de la Tour.  In 1913 he won the Prix de Rome with his cantata Les fiancés de Noël.

After the First World War, Jongen travelled the world: he visited Africa, India, China, Japan, and Hanoi. While in Hanoi he conducted the Tonkin Opera from 1927 to 1929. In 1934 he returned to Belgium to become a professor of fugue at the Royal Conservatory of Brussels. The Commission de surveillance gave his several directorial responsibilities in 1938 and officially appointed him as director on August 1, 1939. He succeeded his brother Joseph Jongen. His appointment as director lasted till  1949. Between 1960 and 1962 Léon Jongen was the chairman of the Queen Elisabeth Competition.

Jongen composed symphonic works and operas. Even though he was a great admirer of the French romantic school and even knew some influence by César Franck, his musical style evolved towards more modernistic traits.  He died in Brussels.

Selected works

 Étude Symphonique pour Servir de Prélude à l' Oedipe Roi 1908
 Roxelane 1920
 Suite Provençale 1926
 Suite Provençale No. 3 1926
 Campeador 1932
 In Memoriam Regis  1934
 Malaisie 1935
 Venezuela 1936
 Fanfare 1939
 Improvisation 1943
 Six Esquisses 1943
 Quatre Miniatures 1949
 Musique pour un Ballet 1954
 Divertissement en Forme de Variations sur un Thème de Haydn 1955
 Fanfare 1957

References

External links
 Biography and list of works at CeBeDeM

1884 births
1969 deaths
Flemish composers
Prix de Rome (Belgium) winners
Royal Conservatory of Liège alumni